The Port Macquarie Campus of Hastings Secondary College is a government-funded co-educational comprehensive secondary day school campus, located in Port Macquarie in the Mid North Coast region of New South Wales, Australia.

Established in 1962,  the campus enrolled approximately 635 students in 2018, from Year 7 to Year 12, of whom 14 percent identified as Indigenous Australians and nine percent were from a language background other than English. The school is operated by the NSW Department of Education; the principal is Meaghan Cook.

Notable alumni 
 Scott Cainsinger and presenter
 Nabil Elderkinfilm and music video director and photographer
 Allison Shreevewindsurfer

References

External links
 
 
 Official Board Of Studies Information Site
 E - Learning Student Interface
 NSW Schools website

Public high schools in New South Wales
Port Macquarie
Educational institutions established in 1962
1962 establishments in Australia